This is the discography of British singer-songwriter Tony Christie.

Albums

Studio albums

Live albums

Compilation albums

Singles

References

Discographies of British artists
Pop music discographies
Rock music discographies